Adrian Ma, better known mononymously as Adrian, is an American professional League of Legends player who was most recently the support for Echo Fox of the LCS. He graduated from high school early at age 17 to attend the first varsity college esports team in the world, the program at Robert Morris University Illinois. Adrian has also played for  XDG Gaming and Team Impulse.

On July 18, 2015, he temporarily stepped down from his role on the starting roster of Team Impulse. In December 2015, the newly formed NA LCS team Immortals announced they had acquired Adrian, however, after a poor performance in both the Spring and Summer playoffs for the NA LCS, Immortals announced his release in late 2016. In 2017, it was announced that he had been acquired by NA LCS team Phoenix 1, later playing for Team Liquid and Team Dignitas in the same year.

Tournament results

Team Impulse
 4th — 2015 NA LCS Spring playoffs
 4th — 2015 NA LCS Summer playoffs

Immortals
 1st — 2016 NA LCS Spring Round Robin	
 3rd — 2016 NA LCS Spring Playoffs
 2nd — 2016 NA LCS Summer regular season

References

Robert Morris University Illinois alumni
People from Houston
Team Impulse players
Living people
1997 births
American esports players
Immortals (esports) players
League of Legends support players